Yonggom is one of the Ok languages of West Papua and Papua New Guinea. It is very close to North Muyu, which is also called 'Yonggom'.

Phonology

Consonants 

 /b, d/ can become fricatives [β, ð] intervocalically in fast speech.
 /k/ can be heard as a fricative [ɣ] in fast speech.
 /ɾ/ becomes [l] in word-initial position.
 /j/ is heard as an affricate [dʒ] when following a plosive.

Vowels 

 /i/ becomes [ɪ] when before /s/ or a word-final /n/.
 /ɛ/ becomes more close as [e] when before a sonorant back consonant.

References

External links 
 Paradisec has an open access collection that includes Yonggom language materials

Languages of Western Province (Papua New Guinea)
Ok languages